The 2018 CBR Brave season was the Brave's 5th season in the Australian Ice Hockey League since being founded and entering the league in 2014. The season ran from 21 April 2018 to 2 September 2018 for the Brave. CBR finished first in the regular season to clinch their maiden H Newman Reid Trophy. The team set then AIHL records for most wins and points in a season. The Brave completed the double and claimed their first Goodall Cup trophy and the AIHL Championship in Melbourne in September. CBR defeated the Melbourne Mustangs in the first semi-final 5–1 before overcoming the Sydney Bears in the final 4–3 with an overtime winner scored by Trevor Gerling. The Brave became the first Canberra based ice hockey franchise to lift the Goodall Cup and the second Canberra based team overall, following the ACT representative team's victory in 1998. Canberra Brave's Dave and Jayden Lewis became the first father-son duo in Australian Ice Hockey League history to lift the Goodall Cup. American import forward, Trevor Gerling, finished equal top points scorer in the league. Canadian import goaltender, Matt Hewitt, finished top in the league goaltender standings and Australian international, Wahebe Darge, won the AIHL best local player award for 2018. Foundation player, Jordie Gavin who was instrumental in building the CBR Brave following the collapse of the Canberra Knights, retired after the 2018 AIHL final.

Roster

Team roster for the 2018 AIHL season

Transfers

All the player transfers in and out by the CBR Brave for the 2018 AIHL season.

In

Out

Staff

Staff Roster for 2018 AIHL season

Standings

Regular season

Summary

Position by round

League table

Source

Finals

Summary

Bracket

Schedule & results

Regular season

Finals
Goodall Cup semi-final

Goodall Cup final

Player statistics

Skaters

Goaltenders

Awards

References

CBR Brave seasons